General Tinio National High School (GTNHS) is a public high school located in General Tinio, Nueva Ecija.

High schools in Nueva Ecija
Educational institutions established in 1964
1964 establishments in the Philippines